Eugene "Gene" Hassell was a minor league baseball player and manager. He played eleven years in the minor leagues then managed for another eleven in the minors. As a player, Hassell was an infielder with a high on-base percentage and speed but without power; he failed to hit a single home run in his professional baseball career. He led his league at least once in walks, OBP and steals.

Hassell broke in with the 1951 Wilson Tobs, hitting .274. In 1952, he returned to the Tobs. He was second in OBP, trailing only  Wayne Blackburn, and drew a Coastal Plain League leading 142 walks while only striking out 27 times. Hassell stole 40 bases, fourth in the league, and scored 98 runs, second best. His .955 fielding percentage led league's third basemen by 25 points and he had the most double plays (30), putouts (141) and assists (346) at the hot corner despite being 7th in the 8-team league in errors (23).

In 1953, Gene played for the St. Petersburg Saints, hitting .318. He walked 143 times in 132 games while only striking out nineteen times in 132 AB. He led the Florida International League in walks, OBP and stolen bases (42). He scored 103 runs. His .979 fielding percentage led second basemen with 100+ games while he led league in putouts (364), assists (420) and double plays (88) for his position.

Hassell spent most of 1954 with the Burlington-Graham Pirates, hitting .337, and hit .286 in a brief stint with the Denver Bears. In 1955, Hassell played for the Birmingham Barons, hitting .306 with 108 walks to fifteen strikeouts. He just missed the Southern Association's top 3 in OBP, tied Edward White for third in runs (97) and was second in the league in walks.

In 1956, Hassell made his AAA debut, with Denver (Denver had been a Class A team when he was them in 1954). Gene hit .319 with twenty-four runs batted in as the leadoff hitter for a team that made the American Association finals. He was among the circuit's top ten in batting average. In 1957, Hassell returned to the Bears and hit .308. He only had 188 AB in 85 games, backing up Curt Roberts at second base and Rance Pless at third base, plus being a key pinch hitter for Denver. In the Junior World Series, Gene got the start at second base with Roberts suffering a leg injury and the sub went four for thirteen with two doubles, a triple and a steal as the leadoff hitter for the Bears. Denver won the title, but Hassell hurt his leg while doubling to lead off the finale and Roberts had to play despite his own pains and limitations.

In 1958, Gene hit .292 for Denver, followed by a .284 campaign in 1959. In 1960, he moved to the Charleston Senators but hit just .211. He faded even further in his final season, only hitting .122 for the Amarillo Gold Sox and .198 for the Des Moines Demons.

Year-by-Year Managerial Record 

Living people
Atlanta Braves scouts
Minor league baseball managers
Year of birth missing (living people)